Juraj Minčík (born 27 March 1977 in Spišská Stará Ves) is a Slovak slalom canoeist who competed at the international level from 1993 to 2008.

He competed at two Summer Olympics and won a bronze medal in the C1 event in Sydney in 2000.

Minčík also won three medals in the C1 team event at the ICF Canoe Slalom World Championships with two golds (1997, 2003) and a bronze (1995). At the European Championships he has won a total 8 medals (5 golds and 3 silvers).

As a coach he led Ladislav Škantár and Peter Škantár to Olympic gold and Matej Beňuš to Olympic silver at the 2016 Summer Olympics.

World Cup individual podiums

References

External links 
 
 
 

1977 births
Canoeists at the 1996 Summer Olympics
Canoeists at the 2000 Summer Olympics
Living people
Olympic canoeists of Slovakia
Olympic bronze medalists for Slovakia
Slovak male canoeists
Olympic medalists in canoeing
Medalists at the 2000 Summer Olympics
Medalists at the ICF Canoe Slalom World Championships
People from Kežmarok District
Sportspeople from the Prešov Region